Things To Try Before You Die (sometimes shortened to Things To Try) was an Australian travel show that was produced by and aired on the Nine Network. Making its debut on 17 July 2007, each episode of the show focused on a particular country and counted down the top 30 things that one 'must try' in that country.

The show was similar to Getaway, a travel show also airing on the Nine Network.

Presenters
 Jules Lund
 Livinia Nixon
 Gary Sweet

Episodes

Season 1

See also
 List of Australian television series

External links
 Official website. It now redirects to NineMSN's travel section.

Australian non-fiction television series
Australian travel television series
Nine Network original programming
2007 Australian television series debuts
2007 Australian television series endings